Huodendron is a genus of four species of flowering plants in the family Styracaceae, native to eastern Asia, from southern China south to Thailand and Vietnam.

The species are small to medium-sized deciduous trees growing to 12–25 m tall.

Species
 Huodendron biaristatum (W.W.Smith) Rehder
 Huodendron parviflorum H.L.Li
 Huodendron tibeticum (J. Anthony) Rehder
 Huodendron tomentosum Y.C.Tang ex S.M.Hwang

References

Styracaceae
Ericales genera
Taxonomy articles created by Polbot